Francis Dunham Wormuth (1909 – 1980) was an American lawyer and teacher, having been a Distinguished Professor at the University of Utah.

References

1909 births
1980 deaths
University of Utah faculty
20th-century American lawyers